Kyrie Jamal Wilson (born November 5, 1992) is an American professional gridiron football linebacker for the Winnipeg Blue Bombers of the Canadian Football League (CFL). He played college football for the Fresno State Bulldogs. He has also been a member of the Oakland Raiders of the National Football League (NFL).

Professional career

Oakland Raiders 
Wilson signed with the Oakland Raiders after going undrafted in the 2016 NFL Draft. However, he was released as part of the team's final roster cuts before the start of the 2016 season.

Winnipeg Blue Bombers 
Wilson first signed with the Winnipeg Blue Bombers on April 19, 2017. He made his professional debut in the Banjo Bowl that year on September 9, 2017. He played in five games in 2018 and signed a two-year extension to remain with the team early in 2019. He played a key role in the Blue Bombers' defence at linebacker throughout the 2019 Winnipeg Blue Bombers season as he started in all 18 regular season games, recording 63 defensive tackles, three sacks, and an interception. Wilson helped the Bombers to the 107th Grey Cup in 2019. His efforts in the game included five tackles and a pass break-up on a two point conversion attempt that saw the Bombers win their first Grey Cup in 29 years and Wilson's first CFL championship.

Wilson signed a two-year extension with the Blue Bombers in January 2021, keeping him with the team through the next two seasons. He suffered a hip flexor injury in the first game of the season and did not play again until the end of September. Wilson finished the regular season with 16 tackles over seven games played. Despite the injuries he was a key part of the team that wen to defend their Grey Cup title in the 2021 CFL Final against the hometown Tiger-Cats in Hamilton. Trailing 22-10, the defence would rally the team as they would go to overtime and take the lead 33-25. There, after a tip drill with two Blue Bomber teammates, Wilson caught the pass deflected to him by Winston Rose sealing his and the team's second consecutive title. Wilson's father, step-mother, sister, and brother were all in attendance for the game and made their way down to the field to celebrate with him. Considering the season and the title in the middle of the pandemic, Wilson said that "Sometimes when you’re not able to do certain things, your mind starts to wander or you start questioning whether you still want to do it, but we were all locked in. It just shows that no matter what you go through, there’s a light at the end of the tunnel. Some stuff might be tough, but it’s all going to work out in the end."

Wilson suffered an Achilles injury early in the 2022 season and was expected to miss a significant amount of time recovering.

Statistics

CFL

References

External links

Winnipeg Blue Bombers bio

1992 births
Living people
African-American players of Canadian football
American football linebackers
Sportspeople from Fresno, California
Winnipeg Blue Bombers players
Canadian football linebackers
Fresno State Bulldogs football players
21st-century African-American sportspeople